Gaudreau is a French surname and may refer to:

 Antoine Gaudreau, French furniture maker
 François Gaudreau, Canadian politician
 Frédérick Gaudreau, Canadian ice hockey centre
 Johnny Gaudreau, American ice hockey winger
 Rob Gaudreau, American ice hockey winger

Surnames
French-language surnames